Mucilaginibacter pineti is a bacterium from the genus of Mucilaginibacter which has been isolated from wood from the tree Pinus pinaster.

References

External links
Type strain of Mucilaginibacter pineti at BacDive -  the Bacterial Diversity Metadatabase

Sphingobacteriia
Bacteria described in 2014